Aurelio Scagnellato (26 October 1930 – 10 July 2008) was an Italian football defender and managing director. He is known for his time with the successful Padova side during the late 1950s and early 1960s.

Career
Scagnellato spent his entire professional career with Padova, and was part of the cub's famous defensive line under manager Rocco – nicknamed The Panzer of Rocco – that contributed decisively to the best ever league placement in the history of the Venetian club, a third-place finish during the 1957–58 Serie A season.

With 349 appearances, he is the player with the most matches played in the history of Padova.

After retiring from football, he took on a series of technical and managerial positions at the club, and also held the position of the team's Sporting Director.

Career statistics

External links 
Profile at Enciclopediadelcalcio.it 

1930 births
2008 deaths
Italian footballers
Calcio Padova players
Serie A players
Serie B players
Italian football managers
Association football defenders